Club Polideportivo Calasancio is a Spanish football team based in Logroño in the autonomous community of La Rioja. Founded in 1977, it plays in 3ª - Group 16. Its stadium is Estadio La Estrella with a capacity of 500 seaters.

History 
In the 2017-18 season the club finished 15th in the Tercera División, Group 16.

Season to season

14 seasons in Tercera División

References

External links
CP Calasancio Official Website  
Futbolme team profile  

Football clubs in La Rioja (Spain)
Sport in Logroño
Association football clubs established in 1977
1977 establishments in Spain